Virgin in a Condom is a controversial sculpture created by Tania Kovats in 1994. It is a three-inch statue of the Virgin Mary covered by a transparent condom. It was stolen from the Museum of Contemporary Art in Sydney, Australia within days of being exhibited. It attracted Christian protesters when it was on display in 1998 at the Museum of New Zealand Te Papa Tongarewa.

See also

 Piss Christ

References

1994 sculptures
Christianity in popular culture controversies
Condoms
Resin sculptures
Stolen works of art
Statues of the Virgin Mary